Stacey Park Milbern (May 19, 1987 – May 19, 2020) was a Korean-American disability rights activist. She helped create the disability justice movement and advocated for fair treatment of disabled people.

Early life
Milbern was born at the U.S. Army Hospital in Seoul on May 19, 1987, with congenital muscular dystrophy (CMD). She was mixed-race, her father being White American and her mother being Korean. She grew up in Fort Bragg, North Carolina, in a military family, as her father was in the United States Army. As a child she relied on her family as caregivers, but when she began to identify as queer, she feared her parents' judgment and planned to move out, a choice made more difficult by her need for help in daily activities such as eating, sleeping, and using the bathroom.

Milbern began serving in disability rights leadership roles at 16 years old, including as Community Outreach Director for the National Youth Leadership Network. She later was a founder of the North Carolina Youth Leadership Forum and Disabled Young People's Collective to empower youth with disabilities to engage in advocacy and leadership. She was appointed by the Governor of North Carolina to the North Carolina Commission for the Blind from 2006 to 2008 and to the Statewide Independent Living Council from 2004 to 2010. She was instrumental in the writing and passing of the 2007 North Carolina law establishing October as "Disability History and Awareness Month" and requiring disability history curriculum to be taught in all schools. In 2005, Milbern helped to establish the disability justice movement through conversations with other disabled queer women of color activists.

Milbern authored a popular disability-rights blog on WordPress throughout the late 2000s, titled "Crip Chick" (later CripChick.com). She graduated from Methodist University in 2009.

Bay Area 
Milbern moved to the San Francisco Bay Area when she was 24, due to the area being "one of the most accessible places for people with physical disabilities". The Bay Area had been the historical center of the disability rights movement, and there she continued to organize, write, and speak for the movement, becoming the director of programs at the Center for Independent Living, Berkeley. California ranks highly among the states for spending on in-home care benefits, and she was able to obtain Medicaid support for an in-home attendant, enabling her to live independently in Oakland and hold a position in human resources at a financial banking company. She credited that nursing assistance for her ability to remain active in the community and avoid institutionalization in a nursing home. She contrasted her independence and the care she was able to receive in California against her experiences in North Carolina, and defended the necessity of Medicaid programs funding home attendant and nursing services against reductions proposed during efforts to repeal and replace the Affordable Care Act. Milbern advocated for fair medical care for people with disabilities, including both access and biases in the system, speaking against unnecessary surgery.

In 2014, Milbern was appointed by President Obama to the President's Committee for People with Intellectual Disabilities. She advised the Obama administration for two years.

Milbern earned a master of business administration degree from Mills College in 2015.

In early March 2020, as the COVID-19 pandemic spread to the Bay Area, Milbern and four friends constituting the Disability Justice Culture Club distributed homemade disease-prevention kits, including hand sanitizer, disinfectant, and respirators, to residents of Oakland homeless encampments. She raised concerns for the well-being of the community and its most vulnerable members. Milbern noted her DIY solution as an example of "crip—or crippled—wisdom". She warned that the pandemic's demands on health services threatened her community's access to dialysis and other life-saving treatments needed by some to survive. Her group also organized a mutual aid campaign, providing food and care support for disabled people in need. Milbern continued pandemic relief work despite her own growing health problems.

Death
Towards the end of her life, she had health problems. Surgery to remove her fast-growing kidney cancer was postponed during the COVID-19 pandemic due to shelter-in-place orders. Milbern died in a Stanford hospital on her 33rd birthday, May 19, 2020, due to surgical complications.

Legacy
Milbern was featured in the Google Doodle on May 19, 2022, which would have been her 35th birthday.

References

External links 
 Stacey Milbern Park on Pushing Limits (June 5, 2020)
 
 National Youth Leadership Network
 North Carolina Youth Leadership Forum

1987 births
2020 deaths
Methodist University alumni
Mills College alumni
People from Seoul
People from the San Francisco Bay Area
American disability rights activists
People with muscular dystrophy
South Korean emigrants to the United States
Deaths from kidney cancer
Deaths from cancer in California
South Korean LGBT people
Queer women